Andrew Morrison (1919–2004) was a Guyanese Roman Catholic Jesuit priest, journalist, and pro-democracy activist.

Andrew Morrison may also refer to:

Andrew Morrison (cricketer) (born 1994), New Zealand cricketeer
Andrew Charles Morrison, best known as Andy Morrison  (born 1970), Scottish football manager and former footballer